Still Motion is a 3-piece rock and roll band from Drexel Hill, Pennsylvania. They draw heavily on the music of the past, namely the rock era of the 60s and 70s, typified by bands like The Rolling Stones, Led Zeppelin, and The Beatles. Classic in spirit yet contemporary in scope, Still Motion's sound is both derivative and dynamic, nostalgic and new. They have recorded several demos but have yet to release a full length album.

Still Motion has played numerous shows in venues in and around the greater Philadelphia area, including the Trocadero Theatre and the North Star Bar. On August 1, 2006, they appeared on NBC (WCAU)'s 10! morning show. Footage of the performance can be seen on YouTube.

See also 
 Still motion

References

External links 
 Still Motion on Myspace

Rock music groups from Pennsylvania
American musical trios